Mount Arrowsmith is the name of several mountains in various locations:

Mount Arrowsmith, Vancouver Island, British Columbia, Canada
Mount Arrowsmith (Antarctica)
Mount Arrowsmith (New Zealand)